Ripe Banana Skins (also known as RBS) is a Ska punk band from Asunción, Paraguay. The band was formed in 1999 and are one of the most popular punk bands in Paraguay.

History
The band was the result of the merge of two other bands: "Toilet Flush" and "Fugu". The band's first name was "Blackfly In Your Soup" but once they established their sound they changed the name to Ripe Banana Skins. The band recorded a few demos and quickly gained fans as a result of touring and being the opening act of the very popular Paraguayan rock band Flou. This allowed the band to tour extensively through Paraguay and also in Brazil and Argentina. 

In November 2003 the band began recording their first self-titled album which quickly rose up the charts when released in 2005. RBS also participated in the popular Paraguayan rock festival "Quilmes Rock", playing in front of more than 40,000 people. 

The band is currently working on their third album.

Discography

Ripe Banana Skins (2005)
 Culo de Mono
 RBS
 Estar vivo
 I wanna be the one
 Papelitos
 Poison in your brain 
 Solo quiero continuar
 Tonight
 Mentalmente deshinibido
 Sabes luego vos
 Ganja men
 Torero
 My girl

Oido Antena (2012)
 Onda Disco
 Chismes
 Dulsong
 Oido Antena
 Surfer Clash
 Alta Gracia (Valijas Llenas)
 Aburrido de Amarte
 Payaso
 Mambo
 Que te pise un tranvía
 Palpitaciones
 Poco Más
 Revoluciones de Colores

Other works
The band has also contributed some songs in other albums such as "Pasalo y Que No Vuelva", a compilation of songs by South American Ska punk bands and "El Nuevo Vuelo del Rock", a compilation of Paraguayan rock bands.

Members
 Andrés  Selich -  (Vocals)
 Rodrigo Cristaldo - (Vocals)
 Pablo G. Blaya - (Guitar)
 Marcelo Soler - (Drums)
 Victor "Pepu" Montanaro - (Guitar)
 Ricardo Velazquez - (Bass)

External links
Official Website
Interview in Atconcert.net

Paraguayan musical groups
Third-wave ska groups